The following article presents a summary of the 1914 football (soccer) season in Brazil, which was the 13th season of competitive football in the country.

Campeonato Paulista

In 1914 there were two different editions of the Campeonato Paulista. One was organized by the Associação Paulista de Esportes Atléticos (APEA) while the other one was organized by the Liga Paulista de Foot-Ball (LPF).

APEA's Campeonato Paulista

Final Standings

São Bento declared as the APEA's Campeonato Paulista champions.

LPF's Campeonato Paulista

Final Standings

Germânia and Hydecroft matches were canceled, as both clubs abandoned the competition.

Corinthians declared as the LPF's Campeonato Paulista champions.

State championship champions

Brazil national team
The Brazil national football team played its first matches in 1914, which are displayed in the following table.

References

External links
 Brazilian competitions at RSSSF
 1914 Brazil national team matches at RSSSF

 
Seasons in Brazilian football
Brazil